James McMullin   was an American baseball player who played in three games in July 1887 for the New York Metropolitans of the American Association.

External links

Major League Baseball pitchers
New York Metropolitans players
19th-century baseball players
Baseball players from California
Date of death missing
Date of birth missing